Seema Rao is popularly known as “Wonder Woman of India” in the Indian media. She is India's first female special forces trainer, having trained Special Forces of India for over two decades without compensation. She is an expert in close quarter battle (CQB) —  the art of fighting in tight proximity — and is involved in training various Indian forces. She works in partnership with Major Deepak Rao, her husband.

Biography 

Born to an Indian freedom fighter, Professor Ramakant Sinari, Rao has an MBA in crisis management. She was a Mrs India World beauty pageant finalist.

Rao earned her Para Wings by skydiving in the Indian Air Force course. She is a combat shooting instructor, an Army mountaineering institute HMI medalist, and an 8th degree Blackbelt in military martial arts. She is one of a handful of instructors authorised to teach Jeet Kune Do. She co-invented a new method of shooting, called The Rao System of Reflex Fire, for close quarters combat, along with her husband Deepak Rao. Together, the Raos are recipients of three Army Chief citations for over two decades of contribution to training 15,000 soldiers.

Rao has co-authored two books—"Encyclopedia of Close Combat Ops" and "A Comprehensive Analysis of World Terrorism". She has also written a book "Handbook of World Terrorism" along with her husband.

Awards and recognition 

Rao was ranked sixth in the 2019 Forbes India W-Power Trailblazer list. She received Nari Shakti Puraskar from the President of India in 2019.

References 

Indian Jeet Kune Do practitioners
Living people
Year of birth missing (living people)
Nari Shakti Puraskar 2018 winners